Aleksandra Avramović (born 3 July 1982) is a Serbian former volleyball player, playing as a middle-blocker. She was part of the Serbia and Montenegro women's national volleyball team.

She competed at the 2005 Women's European Volleyball Championship. On club level she played for CSU Metal Galați in 2005.

References

External links
 
 Aleksandra Avramovic at LegaVolleyFemminile.it 
 Aleksandra Avramovic at the International Volleyball Federation

1982 births
Living people
Serbian women's volleyball players
People from Priboj
Serbian expatriate sportspeople in Romania
Serbian expatriate sportspeople in Italy
Serbian expatriate sportspeople in Azerbaijan
Serbian expatriate sportspeople in Turkey
Serbian expatriate sportspeople in Hungary